The Núcleo Deportivo y de Espectáculos Ameca is a multi-use stadium located in Ameca, Jalisco, Mexico.  It is currently used mostly for football matches and is the home stadium for Catedráticos Élite F.C.  The stadium has a capacity of 7,000 people.

References

External links
http://ligamx.net/cancha/estadio/1005

Sports venues in Jalisco
Núcleo Deportivo y de Espectáculos Ameca
Athletics (track and field) venues in Mexico